In 1961, Billboard published the Hot R&B Sides chart ranking the top-performing songs in the United States in rhythm and blues (R&B) and related African American-oriented music genres; the chart has undergone various name changes over the decades to reflect the evolution of such genres and since 2005 has been published as Hot R&B/Hip-Hop Songs.  During 1961, 14 different singles topped the chart, based on playlists submitted by radio stations and surveys of retail sales outlets.

In the issue of Billboard dated January 2, Jerry Butler was at number one with "He Will Break Your Heart", the song's seventh week in the top spot.  Two weeks later, it was displaced by "Shop Around" by the Miracles featuring Bill "Smokey" Robinson.  "Shop Around" was the first million-selling single for the fledgling Motown label, which would go on to become one of the most successful and influential labels of the 20th century and bring unprecedented levels of mainstream success to black music.  Motown achieved another number one when the Marvelettes topped the chart in November with "Please Mr. Postman", which held the top spot for the final seven weeks of the year.  This song was the first Motown release to also top the all-genre Hot 100 singles chart.

The only act to achieve more than one R&B number one in 1961 was Ray Charles, who topped the chart for a single week in April with "One Mint Julep" and for five weeks beginning in October with "Hit the Road Jack".  The year's longest-running number one was "Tossin' and Turnin'" by Bobby Lewis, which spent ten consecutive weeks atop the chart between July and September.  Almost every act to top the chart in 1961 did so for the first time.  Other than Jerry Butler, whose run atop the chart continued from the previous year, only Bobby "Blue" Bland and Ray Charles had achieved an R&B number one before 1961; Bland had topped the R&B Jockeys chart in 1957, prior to the launch of Billboards combined sales and airplay listing, and Charles had achieved several chart-toppers both before and after the magazine amalgamated its multiple R&B charts in late 1958.  While acts such as Lewis and Ernie K-Doe would experience only brief chart success and never achieve a second number one, the Pips, who would soon give separate billing to lead vocalist Gladys Knight, would remain consistently successful for nearly 30 years.

Chart history

References

Works cited

1961
1961 record charts
1961 in American music